Jane Frances Winters FRHistS is Professor of digital humanities at the School of Advanced Study, University of London.

Life and career 
Jane Winters was born in 1970. She trained as a medieval historian and completed her PhD at King's College London in 1999. Her doctoral thesis was entitled The Forest Eyre, 1154-1368.

Winters is a Director of the Digital Preservation Coalition, and a Fellow and Council Member of the Royal Historical Society. She is a member of the Academic Steering and Advocacy Committee of the Open Library of Humanities. She is a member of the UK UNESCO Memory of the World Committee.

Selected publications
'Negotiating the archives of UK web space', The Historical Web and Digital Humanities: the Case of National Web Domains, ed. Niels Brügger and Ditte Laursen (London: Routledge, 2019)
‘Web archives and (digital) history: a troubled past and a promising future?’, in The SAGE Handbook of Web History, ed. Niels Brügger and Ian Milligan (SAGE Publications Ltd., 2019)
'Digital history’, in Debating New Approaches to History, ed. Marek Tamm and Peter Burke (London: Bloomsbury Publishing, 2018)
‘What does an author want from a publisher?’, Learned Publishing, 31 (4) (September 2018), pp. 318-22
Tackling complexity in humanities big data: from parliamentary proceedings to the archived web, in Big and Rich Data in English Corpus Linguistics: Methods and Variations, ed. Turo Hiltunen, Joe McVeigh and Tanja Säily (Helsinki: Varieng, 2017)
'Breaking in to the mainstream: demonstrating the value of internet (and web) histories', Internet Histories. Digital Technology, Culture and Society, Volume 1, 2017, Issue 1-2
‘Will history survive the digital age?’, BBC History Magazine (March 2017), pp. 39-43

The Creighton century, 1907-2007. Institute of Historical Research, London, 2009.  (ed. with David Bates and Jennifer Wallis)
Peer review and evaluation of digital resources for the arts and humanities. London, 2006. (co-authored report)
Teachers of history in the universities of the UK and the Republic of Ireland (published annually) (joint compiler)
Historical research for higher degrees in the UK and the Republic of Ireland (published annually) (joint compiler)
"The British history online digital library: A model for sustainability?", Bulletin, 176 (2010), 95–106. (with Jonathan Blaney)

See also
British History Online

References

External links
http://blog.history.ac.uk/author/winterconference/

Living people
Academics of the University of London
British women historians
Alumni of King's College London
1970 births
British medievalists
Women medievalists
People in digital humanities